Kamuzu International Airport , also known as Lilongwe International Airport, is an international airport serving Lilongwe, the capital city of Malawi.

History 
The airport was built in 1977 by the Nello L. Teer Company, taking over most airline operations from Old Lilongwe Airport (FWLE) some 6 km west of the city centre.
Owned by Airport Developments Limited. Its ICAO code was originally FWLI.

In the 1990s, Lilongwe had scheduled passenger service to Europe. British Airways and KLM offered one-stop flights to London and Amsterdam, respectively.

Facilities 

Airlines and destinations

Passenger

Cargo

References

External links
 
 

Airports in Malawi
Airport
Airports established in 1977
1977 establishments in Malawi